1319 Disa, provisional designation , is a carbonaceous asteroid from the outer region of the asteroid belt, approximately 25 kilometers in diameter. It was discovered on 19 March 1934, by English-born, South African astronomer Cyril Jackson at Johannesburg Observatory in South Africa. It is named for the orchid Disa.

Orbit 

Disa orbits the Sun in the outer main-belt at a distance of 2.4–3.6 AU once every 5 years and 2 months (1,884 days). Its orbit has an eccentricity of 0.21 and an inclination of 3° with respect to the ecliptic.

Physical characteristics

Rotation period 

A rotational lightcurve of Disa was obtained by American astronomer Brian D. Warner at his Palmer Divide Observatory in March 2006, and by French amateur astronomer Pierre Antonini in February 2011, respectively. Analysis of both lightcurves gave a well-defined rotation period of 7.08 hours with a brightness variation of 0.26 and 0.27 magnitude.

In September 2013, photometric observations in the R-band at the Palomar Transient Factory gave a concurring lightcurve of 7.082 hours and an amplitude of 0.24 magnitude.

Diameter, albedo and spectral type 

According to the surveys carried out by the Japanese Akari satellite, and the 2014-results by NASA's Wide-field Infrared Survey Explorer with its subsequent NEOWISE mission, Disa measures 24.00 and 25.65 kilometers in diameter, and its surface has an albedo of 0.116 and 0.097, respectively.

The Collaborative Asteroid Lightcurve Link assumes a standard albedo for carbonaceous C-type asteroids of 0.057 and calculates a diameter of 40.33 kilometers with an absolute magnitude of 10.7. Preliminary results by NEOWISE also characterized the body as a dark and reddish P-type asteroid.

Naming 

This minor planet was named after Disa, also known as "African weed-orchid", a large genus of more than a hundred tropical orchids, common in southern Africa. In 1955, this naming citation was also published by Paul Herget in The Names of the Minor Planets.

Notes

References

External links 
 Asteroid Lightcurve Database (LCDB), query form (info )
 Dictionary of Minor Planet Names, Google books
 Asteroids and comets rotation curves, CdR – Observatoire de Genève, Raoul Behrend
 Discovery Circumstances: Numbered Minor Planets (1)-(5000)  – Minor Planet Center
 
 

 

001319
Discoveries by Cyril Jackson (astronomer)
Named minor planets
19340319